Conway is a city in Taylor County, Iowa, United States. The population was 17 at the 2020 census.

History
Conway was laid out 1872 by the Burlington and Missouri River Railroad.   The B&M was acquired later than year by the Chicago, Burlington and Quincy Railroad). The town was incorporated in 1878.

Geography
Conway is located at  (40.748742, -94.619544), along the East Fork of the One Hundred and Two River.

Demographics

2010 census
As of the census of 2010, there were 41 people, 16 households, and 9 families residing in the city. The racial makeup of the city was 100.0% White.

There were 16 households, of which 31.3% had children under the age of 18 living with them, 43.8% were married couples living together, 6.3% had a female householder with no husband present, 6.3% had a male householder with no wife present, and 43.8% were non-families. 18.8% of all households were made up of individuals, and 12.5% had someone living alone who was 65 years of age or older. The average household size was 2.56 and the average family size was 3.22.

The median age in the city was 39.5 years. 24.4% of residents were under the age of 18; 7.3% were between the ages of 18 and 24; 21.9% were from 25 to 44; 24.4% were from 45 to 64; and 22% were 65 years of age or older. The gender makeup of the city was 56.1% male and 43.9% female.

2000 census
As of the census of 2000, there were 63 people, 24 households, and 19 families residing in the city. The racial makeup of the city was 100.00% White.

There were 24 households, out of which 33.3% had children under the age of 18 living with them, 62.5% were married couples living together, 12.5% had a female householder with no husband present, and 20.8% were non-families. 12.5% of all households were made up of individuals, and 12.5% had someone living alone who was 65 years of age or older. The average household size was 2.63 and the average family size was 2.89.

In the city, the population was spread out, with 27.0% under the age of 18, 6.3% from 18 to 24, 27.0% from 25 to 44, 23.8% from 45 to 64, and 15.9% who were 65 years of age or older. The median age was 42 years. For every 100 females, there were 65.8 males. For every 100 females age 18 and over, there were 91.7 males.

The median income for a household in the city was $31,250, and the median income for a family was $31,875. Males had a median income of $25,000 versus $26,250 for females. The per capita income for the city was $11,780. There were 38.5% of families and 28.0% of the population living below the poverty line, including 25.0% of under eighteens and 100.0% of those over 64.

Education
Conway is within the Bedford Community School District.

Notable people 

Mike Welday, baseball player.
Waite Phillips, Businessman and philanthropist

References

Cities in Iowa
Cities in Taylor County, Iowa
1872 establishments in Iowa
Populated places established in 1872